Alan M. Holman (December 30, 1904 – October 8, 1994) was an American football player and coach of football and basketball.  Holman played football at Parsons College (1924), Iowa State University (1926) and Ohio State University (1928–1929). Holman was the head football coach at Franklin & Marshall College in Lancaster, Pennsylvania.  He held that position for 11 seasons, from 1931 until 1941, compiling a record of 63–25–5.  Holman was also the head basketball coach at Franklin & Marshall for two seasons, from 1933 to 1935, tallying a mark of 14–13.

Head coaching record

Football

References

1904 births
1994 deaths
American football quarterbacks
Basketball coaches from Missouri
Franklin & Marshall Diplomats football coaches
Franklin & Marshall Diplomats men's basketball coaches
Iowa State Cyclones football players
Ohio State Buckeyes football players
Parsons Wildcats football players
Players of American football from Missouri